The University of Makati, commonly referred to as UMak, is a public, nonsectarian LGU funded higher education institution in Makati, Metro Manila, Philippines. It was founded in 1972 as the Makati Polytechnic Community College by virtue of Municipal Resolution No. 242 Ordinance No. 64.

History
The University of Makati was founded in 1972 as the Makati Polytechnic Community College, also known as MPCC, through Municipal Resolution No. 242 Ordinance No. 64.

MPCC offered technical and vocational programs in industrial and business technology. In 1987, MPCC was renamed Makati College.

The Philippine Army turned over the Fort Andres Bonifacio College to the then Municipal Government of Makati and merged with Makati College in 1990.

In 1991, Makati College was renamed Pamantasan ng Makati by virtue of Municipal Order No. 433.

To be more globally recognized, Pamantasan ng Makati changed its name to University of Makati or UMak in 2002 through City Ordinance 2002-111, paving the way for education innovation in the City of Makati.

By virtue of Municipal Ordinance No. 433, the Pamantasan ng Makati became a chartered university on December 19, 1991, under the administration of Jejomar Binay. On August 27, 2002, City Ordinance 2002-111 was approved, amending City Ordinance No. 99-126, revising the Pamantasan ng Makati Charter to change the official name of Pamantasan ng Makati to University of Makati.

In 2022, the Supreme Court of the Philippines ruled that Makati should stop exercising jurisdiction over West Rembo, where the University of Makati is located, effectively placing the university in Taguig.

Buildings and facilities

The university is located at J.P. Rizal Extension, West Rembo, in front of Makati Park and Garden and the Pasig River.

UMak facilities include Academic Buildings 1, 2, and 3, Administrative Building, Health and Physical Science Building (HPSB), Makati Grand Stadium and University Track and Oval Field. as well as:

 University Hostel and Culinary Arts Facilities - Academic Building 1
 Technical and Vocational Lab - Academic Building 1
 University Library - 2nd floor, Admin Building and 5th floor, Health and Physical Science Building (HPSB)
 Mini Theater - Ground floor, Admin Building
 Grand Theater - 6th floor, Admin Building
 Animation Lab - 6th floor, Admin Building
 Media Center and Studio - 6th floor, Admin Building
 Marine Simulation Room - 5th Floor, Admin Building
 Simulated Hospital - 6th Floor, Health and Physical Science Building (HPSB)
 Science, Pharmacology and Zoology Lab - 9th Floor, Health and Physical Science Building (HPSB)
 Student Center - Between floors of the Health and Physical Science Building (HPSB)
 Indoor Basketball and Volleyball courts - 12th floor, Health and Physical Science Building (HPSB)
 Dance and Aero Dance Studios - 11th floor, Health and Physical Science Building (HPSB)
 11th Floor Cafe - 11th floor, Health and Physical Science Building (HPSB)
 Multimedia Rooms and Skills Lab - Health and Physical Science Building (HPSB)
 Moot Court - 5th Floor, Health and Physical Science Building (HPSB)

In March 2022, the university is undergoing a renovation of its Administrative and Academic building that lasts long up to 300 calendar days. Administrative offices temporarily moved to Health and Physical Building. During the renovation, all landlines are temporarily not available.

Academic and Institution

Senior High School
Higher School of UMak (HSU)
UMak was one of the first universities in the Philippines to pilot the Senior High School Modelling Program of the Department of Education, in 2012.

Institues
Institute of Pharmacy (IOP)
Institute of Nursing (ION) 
Institute of Imaging and Health Sciences (IIHS) 
Institute of Accountancy (IOA)

Colleges
College of Arts and Letters (CAL)
College of Business and Financial Science (CBFS)
College of Computing and Information Sciences (CCIS) (formerly College of Computer Sciences)
College of Education (COE)
College of Construction Sciences and Engineering (CCSE)
College of Technology Management (CTM)
College of Governance and Public Policy (CGPP)
College of Maritime Leadership Innovation (CMLI)
College of Science (COS)
College of Tourism and Hospitality Management (CTHM)
Center of Human Kinesthetics (CHK)
School of Law (SOL)

Centers
Center for National Service Training (CNST)

Continuing education
College of Continuing Advanced Professional Studies (CCAPS)

UMak-MInD Center and Dual Training System (DTS)
The UMak-Medical Informatics Development (MIND) Center program is the first and only industry-academe partnership program in the country for health informatics advocacy, training, implementation, and research and development. The UMak-MInD Center is in collaboration with E-Health Records International.

The Dual Training System (DTS) of the College of Technology Management has offered a three-year multi-skilled program for Industrial Facilities Technology (IFT) since 2002. The DTS strategy was eventually adopted for the four-year bachelor courses in Building Technology Management and Bachelor in Electrical Technology, which were developed in partnership with the Philippine Association of Building Administrators (PABA). The Bachelor in Building and Property Management was developed in partnership with Building Owners, Managers Association of the Philippines (BOMAP) which led to the development of DTS variant called Dualized University Education System (DUES).

Sports

The varsity team of the University of Makati are the UMak's Great Brave Herons. The school's athletic program participated in the National Athletic Association of Schools, Colleges and Universities (NAASCU) and the Association of Local Colleges and Universities Games. UMak is the seven-time overall champion of ALCU Games. UMak is a founding member of the newest collegiate league in the country: the University, Colleges and Schools Athletic Association (UCSAA).

Among the athletes of UMak are the following:

Jasmin Figueroa is an archer who participated at the 2004 Athens Olympics. During the Olympics, she defeated former World Champion Natalia Valeeva of Italy. She was also a gold medalist at the South East Asian Games.
Edwin Asoro led the university in the finals of NAASCU in 2002. The 6'4" Asoro was drafted by the Barako Bull during the Philippine Basketball Association (PBA) 2009 rookie draft. He was a part of the Philippine under-20 national basketball team that competed in the 2004 Asian Basketball Championship. Asoro played at the wing and power forward positions during his stint with the Bulldogs in the UAAP and Harbour Centre and Oracle in the Philippine Basketball League.
Rachelle Anne Cabral is a South East Asian Games Gold Medalist in archery.
Ayssa Dalida is a squash player who represented the Philippines at the 16th Asian Games in Guangzhou, China.
Charlene Gillego was a draftee at an annual event in the Philippine Super Liga (PSL) calendar when teams can acquire new players outside the league who are not free agents in an agreed-upon order. She was a fourth pick in the second round. She was a member of Cagayan Valley Rising Suns.

International Recognition and Awards

In 31st South East Asian Games 2021 - Vietnam, Mark Gayon and Mary Joy Renigen bagged 1 GOLD medal in Slow Foxtrot and 2 silver medals in Waltz and Quickstep.
Paul Marton Dela Cruz, a UMak Alumnus Heron, for bagging the Silver Medal in Mixed Team Compound Category and Bronze Medal in Men's Team Compound for Archery in the 31st SEA Games!

See also
 Local college and university (Philippines)
 Association of Local Colleges and Universities
 Pamantasan
 Alculympics

References

External links
University of Makati website

Local colleges and universities in Metro Manila
Universities and colleges in Makati
1972 establishments in the Philippines
Educational institutions established in 1972